"No Tomorrow, Pt. 2" is a song by American singer Brandy Norwood, featuring fellow American singer Ty Dolla Sign. It is a remix of the song "No Tomorrow" taken from Norwood's seventh studio album, B7 (2020). "No Tomorrow" is a minimalist mid-tempo track with instrumentation from synthesizers, a piano, bass kicks, and finger snaps. It was written by Norwood and Joshua "YXSH" Thomas, while production was handled by Norwood, Thomas and Cory Rooney, with co-production by Darhyl "DJ" Camper.

The remix was released as the album's third single on October 14, 2020. "No Tomorrow" was part of Norwood's set lists of her performances at the Billboard Music Awards and on Dick Clark's New Year's Rockin' Eve in 2020.

Background
Brandy Norwood and Joshua "YXSH" Thomas wrote the lyrics of "No Tomorrow", while its production was handled by Norwood, Thomas, and Cory Rooney, with additional production from Darhyl "DJ" Camper. Additional lyrics for the remix were penned by singer Ty Dolla Sign. On the collaboration, Norwood said: "I'm a huge fan of Ty Dolla $ign. I think he's a brilliant artist. He's always shown a lot of respect for my music so I just felt like the sound of our voices would be great."

Critical reception
"No Tomorrow" received generally positive reviews from music critics. Adi Mehta, writing for Entertainment Voice, called the song "effortlessly catchy". He found that it "features a memorable chorus full of priceless lines like "I'm gon' blow your phone up / In case there is no tomorrow," and is stunning in the way jagged pieces fall into elegant arrangements of vocals, resolving when Brandy finally declares, "I feel so beautiful"." The Chicago Defender journalist Kimberly M. Dobine cited "No Tomorrow" as one of her favorite songs on B7. She remarked that "the clever vocal arrangements [on the track] show us that she is proudly embracing who she is as an artist, and the "Vocal Bible", we have come to admire."

Teodor Zetko, writing for Exclaim!, found that the song "smoothly — and slightly nihilistically — celebrates a romance and the immediacy of indulging in infatuation, to reduce regret as if life will cease tomorrow." AllMusic editor Andy Kellman called the song a "dizzied love song" and ranked it along with "Rather Be" among "the sweetest songs in her catalog". Pitchforks Stephen Kearse complimented Camper, Daniels, and Norwood's joint production on the track and wrote: "The propulsive finger snaps and bass kicks of “No Tomorrow” contrast the song's grim subject matter about the end of a relationship."

Live performances
On October 14, 2020, Norwood performed "No Tomorrow, Pt. 2" live for the first time as part of a medley, also consisting of previous single "Borderline" and her 1999 single "Almost Doesn't Count", at the Billboard Music Awards. Her first performance at the awards ceremony in twenty-five years, she performed without a live audience due to COVID-19 protocols, wearing black pants and a lacy white top with long jacket, with her hair braided in various top knots. Ty Dolla $ign joined her only for the "No Tomorrow" portion of the medley. The pair sang to each other while maintaining their distance on stage. Norwood received generally positive reviews, with Stephen Daw from Billboard calling it "a stunning medley". In his review for TVLines Andy Swift declared the performance a "triumphant return".

Credits and personnel
Credits lifted from the liner notes of B7.

Andy Barnes – engineer
DJ Camper – co-producer
Jaycen Joshua – mastering, mixing
Brandy Norwood – producer, vocals, writer

Cory Rooney – producer
Joshua "YXSH" Thomas – producer, writer
Ty Dolla Sign – vocals, writer (Part 2)

Release history

References

2020 singles
Brandy Norwood songs
Songs written by Brandy Norwood
2020 songs
MNRK Music Group singles
Songs written by Ty Dolla Sign